Will Carter Keall (born 1997) is an English field hockey player and player for Men's England Hockey League side Old Georgians.

Field hockey career
Carter Keall was educated at Abingdon School where he played for the first XI and gained colours. He joined the Wallingford Wildacts before being selected for the under-16 England team.

He was selected for the under-16, under-18 and under-21 England teams, and joined leading Men's England Hockey League side Reading Hockey Club. Ferom 2016 until 2019, he played for EHL team University of Exeter Hockey Club while undergoing Economics studies there. This culminated in him captaining the team to the gold medal at the British Universities and Colleges Sport Championship defeating Durham University Hockey Club in the final.

After leaving University and for 2019-20 season he signed for Old Georgians Hockey Club.

Personal life
His younger brother Max Carter Keall also plays for Reading and is a former Under-18 England international.

See also
 List of Old Abingdonians

References

English male field hockey players
People educated at Abingdon School
Living people
1997 births
Place of birth missing (living people)
Reading Hockey Club players
Men's England Hockey League players